The Uruguayan Championship 1921 was the 21st season of Uruguay's top-flight football league.

Overview
The tournament consisted of a two-wheel championship of all against all. It involved twelve teams, and the champion was Peñarol.

Teams

League standings

References 

Uruguay - List of final tables (RSSSF)

Uruguayan Primera División seasons
Uru
1